Jairo Lima de Araújo known as Jairo Araújo in Jairo (born July 7, 1961) is a retired Brazilian footballer who played as a defender in Brazil and manager.

Honours
Gama
 Campeonato Brasiliense: 1995, 1997, 1998
 Campeonato Brasileiro Série B: 1998

Brasiliense
 Campeonato Brasiliense: 2004, 2005, 2006
 Campeonato Brasileiro Série B: 2004

Atlético Goianiense
 Campeonato Goiano: 2007, 2010, 2011
 Campeonato Brasileiro Série C: 2008

References

1974 births
Living people
Association football central defenders
Footballers from Brasília
Brazilian footballers
Brazilian football managers
Campeonato Brasileiro Série A players
Campeonato Brasileiro Série B players
Campeonato Brasileiro Série C players
Campeonato Brasileiro Série B managers
Sociedade Esportiva do Gama players
Associação Atlética Portuguesa (Santos) players
Guarani FC players
Sociedade Esportiva Matonense players
Brasiliense Futebol Clube players
Atlético Clube Goianiense players
Atlético Clube Goianiense managers
Esporte Clube Rio Verde managers
Clube Recreativo e Atlético Catalano managers
Ceilândia Esporte Clube managers